Cynthia Ní Mhurchú (born 1966) is an Irish barrister from Carlow and previously a radio host with Raidió Teilifís Éireann (RTÉ). She presented Eurovision Song Contest 1994 in Dublin along with Gerry Ryan.

Biography
Ní Mhurchú initially worked as a teacher in an Irish language school in Carlow and then spent ten years working as a journalist and presenter in RTÉ, RTÉ Raidió na Gaeltachta and as a freelancer. She has also been a web columnist for several years and has written extensively on education, training and careers. She became a barrister after leaving RTÉ.

During the 1990s, she presented RTE's Lotto Draw.

Ní Mhurchú is married and has two children.

See also
 List of Eurovision Song Contest presenters

References

External links
 RTÉ profile
 Irish Law Library profile

1966 births
20th-century Irish people
21st-century Irish people
Living people
Irish barristers
Irish columnists
Irish schoolteachers
RTÉ television presenters
People from County Carlow
RTÉ newsreaders and journalists
RTÉ Radio presenters
Irish women lawyers
RTÉ Raidió na Gaeltachta presenters
Women television journalists
Women radio journalists
Irish women columnists